Justin David Blau (born January 9, 1991), better known by his stage name 3LAU (pronounced "Blau"), is an American DJ and electronic dance music producer. Raised in New York and Las Vegas, 3LAU left Washington University in St. Louis, where he studied finance. He has produced original tracks including “How You Love Me,” “Is It Love,” “Fire,” “On My Mind,” and “Hot Water,” as well as remixes for Rihanna, Katy Perry, Shawn Mendes, and Ariana Grande and collaborations with gamer Ninja and HYO of Girls' Generation. 3LAU has also appeared at festivals such as Electric Zoo, EDC Vegas, Lollapalooza, and Life Is Beautiful, and tours extensively internationally.

Early life
Justin David Blau was born in Syosset, New York, on January 9, 1991 Blau grew up in an artistic family and was soon playing piano and guitar and singing. At 13, he moved with his family to Las Vegas, Nevada, where he spent the rest of his youth. He attended The Meadows School for high school and Washington University in St. Louis for college.

Background 
Much of 3LAU's music incorporates electro house, dubstep, deep house, and progressive house. He is known for his melodic take on dance music and live sets that incorporate sampling. The emotional purpose of his style of songwriting, Blau says, is to inspire others to overcome their sense of feeling lost. “Every song is somehow about being lost in some way, whether that's in love, in life, in mental health, whatever it may be. Sometimes the lyrics shed light on the brighter parts, but in many ways, I write as a means to try to combat that feeling of being lost and I hope the music can do that for someone else.”

Music career

2011–12: First releases
In 2011, at the age of 20, he vacationed in Sweden, where he discovered electronic dance music. After returning to college he started producing mashups, "mainly because [he] didn't think anyone was doing a good job." He soon began mixing under the professional name 3LAU, and by June of that year, was uploading mashups to YouTube.

3LAU gained recognition in the electronic music world in 2011 with his two bootlegs, "Girls Who Save the World" and "All Night Long". He also won a remix competition for his remix of Tiesto's "Work Hard, Play Hard".

Before 2012, 3LAU spent his days studying at Washington University in St. Louis and DJing at night. He has had remixes charts in the top 10 on both Beatport and Hype Machine.

2012–15: Singles, touring
In 2012, he focused on DJing and launched his 3LAU Your Mind tour. That same year, he released his second bootleg album, Dance Floor Filth. In 2012, the Las Vegas Review-Journal described him as "one of America's fastest-rising DJ-producers." In 2012 he released Dance Floor Filth 2, an album featuring his production.

In late 2013, he went on a short tour with Carnage called the Night Riot tour. Wrote Jonah Ollman of Sound of Boston about 3LAU's live performances in late 2013, "A nice balance of mashups, electro-house, poppy vocal samples, and a 90's throwback here and there keep the young 20-something crowd going and constantly entertained."

In the summer of 2015, 3LAU did his first European tour visiting Barcelona, Germany and Ibiza. Later that fall, he went on his first Asian tour which included Bangkok, Jakarta, Tokyo and more.

2016-17: Blume Records 
In 2016 3LAU launched Blume Records, an independent label with a ground-breaking model that harnesses the power of streaming to raise money for charitable causes. 3LAU stated, "Hopefully we can inspire other people to act and there will be this domino effect."

2018-19: Ultraviolet, OMF

On February 16, 2018, 3LAU released his debut album Ultraviolet on label "BLUME" featuring singles "Touch," "On My Own", "Walk Away" and "Star Crossed". The album features collaborations with Carly Paige, Nevve, Emma Hewitt, Max Schneider, Said the Sky, and Neonheart. The album hit No. 1 on iTunes' Electronic Chart, as did lead single "Touch." On June 21, 2018, 3LAU announced the launch of OMF (Our Music Festival), the first blockchain-powered music festival. The festival was held on October 20, 2018 in San Francisco and was headlined by Zedd.

Charity work 
In 2016, 3LAU launched the record label Blume, the first not-for-profit dance music label. Profits from all songs released on Blume are dedicated to charity. 3LAU has raised over $200,000 for non-profit Pencils of Promise, which used the funds donated to build a seven-classroom school in Guatemala, as well as to fund clean water, education, and teacher development programs. In 2013, 3LAU announced he had built his first school with the non-profit and in 2018 another school was completed in Guatemala.

Discography

Albums

Singles

Remixes 

 Zedd – "Spectrum" (3LAU Remix)
 James Egbert – "Back to New" (3LAU Remix)
 Kap Slap – "E.T. Feels Starry Eyed" (3LAU Remix)
 Adele – "Set Fire to the Rain" (3LAU Bootleg)
 Tiësto – "Red Lights" (3LAU's Acoustic Version)
 Blinders featuring Charles – "Always" (3LAU Mix)
 Jessie J, Ariana Grande, Nicki Minaj – "Bang Bang" (3LAU Remix)
 Shawn Mendes – "Stitches" (3LAU Remix)
 Anitta and Alesso – Is That for Me (3LAU Remix)
 Justin Bieber – "Sorry" (3LAU Remix)
 The Chainsmokers – "Don't Let Me Down" (3LAU Remix)
 Ariana Grande – "Into You" (3LAU Remix)
 Katy Perry – "Bon Appétit" (3LAU Remix)
 3LAU and Audien – "Hot Water" (3LAU DNB Remix) 
 Rihanna – Desperado (3LAU Remix)
 Alesso – Is That for Me (3LAU Remix)
 3LAU – "Star Crossed" (3LAU DnB Remix)
 3LAU – "On My Own" (3LAU Electro Remix)
 San Holo — "Lost Lately" (3LAU Remix)

See also
Royal.io

References

External links
Official website
3LAU on SoundCloud
3LAU on VEVO
3LAU on AllMusic
3LAU on Discogs

American DJs
American electronic musicians
American house musicians
Record producers from New York (state)
Club DJs
Living people
Musicians from Las Vegas
People from Syosset, New York
Remixers
Washington University in St. Louis alumni
1991 births
Revealed Recordings artists
Dim Mak Records artists
Electronic dance music DJs